Alpha-fucosidase may refer to one of two enzymes:
Fucosidase
Alpha-L-fucosidase